The following is a list of state highways in the U.S. state of Louisiana designated in the 3150–3199 range.


Louisiana Highway 3150

Louisiana Highway 3150 (LA 3150) runs  in a north–south direction along Minnich Lane from LA 1 to a point near Louisiana Avenue, a local road, in Grand Isle, Jefferson Parish.  It is an undivided two-lane highway for its entire length.

The route was designated as LA 574-10 prior to 1972, when five digit routes were eliminated by the state highway department.

Louisiana Highway 3151

Louisiana Highway 3151 (LA 3151) runs  in a general north–south direction along Humble Road, looping off of LA 1 in Grand Isle, Jefferson Parish.  It is an undivided two-lane highway for its entire length.

The route was designated as LA 574-11 prior to 1972, when five digit routes were eliminated by the state highway department.

Louisiana Highway 3152

Louisiana Highway 3153

Louisiana Highway 3153 (LA 3153) ran  in a north–south direction along Transcontinental Drive from US 61 (Airline Highway) to West Metairie Avenue in Metairie, Jefferson Parish.  It was a divided four-lane highway for its entire length.

Transcontinental Drive began as a main thoroughfare through the Bridgedale subdivision, which opened in 1925 during construction of the Airline Highway between Shrewsbury and Kenner.  In 1930, it was designated as State Route 1246 in the pre-1955 Louisiana Highway system.  Transcontinental Drive was intended to be extended south to Jefferson Highway (State Route 1) to connect with the Huey P. Long Bridge then in the planning stages.  These plans never came to fruition, and the Bridgedale area would not be not directly connected to the bridge for almost fifty years via an extension of Clearview Parkway.  State Route 1246 became LA 611-11 in the 1955 Louisiana Highway renumbering and assumed its present number in 1972.  The route was returned to local control by 1986.

Louisiana Highway 3154

Louisiana Highway 3154 (LA 3154) runs  in a north–south direction from LA 48 in Harahan to US 61 in Metairie, Jefferson Parish.

The route initially heads north on Hickory Avenue, an undivided two-lane thoroughfare, from LA 48 (Jefferson Highway) in Harahan.  At Roberts Street, signs direct traffic onto Dickory Avenue, a parallel divided four-lane thoroughfare, to continue north on LA 3154.  Officially, the route leaves Hickory Avenue further north via Gardner Street (also the connector for southbound traffic), requiring a U-turn before proceeding north on Dickory Avenue.  Now outside the Harahan city limits, LA 3154 intersects LA 3139 (Earhart Expressway) and proceeds across the Canadian National Railway (CN) tracks via an overpass into Metairie.  The highway proceeds a short distance further to its terminus at US 61 (Airline Drive).

LA 3154 was designated as LA 611-12 prior to 1972, when five digit routes were eliminated by the state highway department.  The route originally followed Hickory Avenue for its entire length and crossed what was then the Illinois Central Railroad (IC) line at grade.  Construction began in 1974 on a four-lane bypass of Hickory Avenue that would include a railroad overpass and an interchange with the future Earhart Expressway.  The new alignment, Dickory Avenue, opened in December 1975 and extended from Citrus Road to Airline Highway (now Airline Drive).  Almost two decades later, Dickory Avenue was extended slightly to the south, providing better access to the Elmwood Business Park.  In 2003, a further extension continued the road to its present terminus just south of 9th Street, providing another route into the Elmwood Business Park via an extension of Mounes Street.  Plans are underway to extend the road to Jefferson Highway and bypass the remainder of Hickory Avenue.

Louisiana Highway 3155

Louisiana Highway 3155 (LA 3155) runs  in a north–south direction along Little Farms Avenue from Russell Avenue in River Ridge to a junction with US 61 (Airline Drive) in Metairie.  It crosses the Canadian National Railway line at grade at its southern end and is an undivided two-lane highway for its entire length.

Little Farms Avenue is the main thoroughfare of the J. H. Little Farms residential subdivision opened in 1925.  The subdivision was laid out alongside the Jefferson Highway (State Route 1 in the pre-1955 Louisiana highway system) and adjacent streetcar line operated by the Orleans-Kenner Traction Company.  Little Farms Avenue was soon extended across the railroad tracks to connect with the newly constructed Airline Highway.  In 1954, the Bunche Village residential subdivision opened adjacent to Little Farms Avenue between the railroad tracks and Airline Highway.

Little Farms Avenue was originally designated as State Route 2220 in the pre-1955 system and included the entire length of the road from Jefferson Highway to Airline Highway (now Airline Drive).  It became LA 611-13 in the 1955 Louisiana Highway renumbering, but in 1972, the route was renumbered to LA 3155 and retained only the section of Little Farms Avenue north of the railroad tracks.

Louisiana Highway 3156

Louisiana Highway 3156 (LA 3156) is a short state-maintained section of Jefferson Street in downtown New Iberia within Iberia Parish. The  highway begins at West St. Peter Street (carrying eastbound LA 182) and travels northeast past a church, school, and a house. After crossing West Main Street (westbound LA 182), it crosses Bayou Teche on the Joe Daigre Bridge, a swing bridge opened in 2014. State maintenance ends just past the bridge at the intersection of Front Street and Indest Street.

Louisiana Highway 3158

Louisiana Highway 3158 (LA 3158) runs  in a north–south direction along South Airport Road from I-12 southeast of Hammond to US 190 in Hammond, Tangipahoa Parish.

The route connects I-12 (Exit 42) with the Hammond Northshore Regional Airport east of downtown Hammond.  Outside of the diamond interchange with I-12, LA 3158 is an undivided two-lane highway for its entire length.  At about the midpoint of its route, LA 3158 intersects Old Covington Highway, a local road formerly designated as LA 1067.  The intersection was converted from a four-way stop to a roundabout in 2010.

Louisiana Highway 3159

Louisiana Highway 3160

Louisiana Highway 3160 (LA 3160) runs  in an east–west direction along Home Place from LA 3127 to LA 18 in Hahnville, St. Charles Parish.

The route connects Hahnville, the parish seat, with LA 3127, a highway constructed in the 1970s that bypasses the various communities along the west bank of the Mississippi River between Luling and Donaldsonville.  It is an undivided two-lane highway for its entire length.

Louisiana Highway 3161

Louisiana Highway 3161 (LA 3161) runs  in an east–west direction from LA 3235 to LA 1 in Cut Off, Lafourche Parish.  The route is a short connector between LA 1 and its four-lane bypass, LA 3235.  It is also signed as the Cote Blanche Connection and is an undivided two-lane highway for its entire length.

Louisiana Highway 3162

Louisiana Highway 3162 (LA 3162) runs  in an east–west direction from LA 3235 to LA 308 in Galliano, Lafourche Parish.  The route is a short connector between LA 1 and its four-lane bypass, LA 3235.  It extends east across Bayou Lafourche by way of a vertical lift bridge, connecting LA 1 and LA 308, which travel along opposite banks of the bayou.  LA 3162 is an undivided two-lane highway for its entire length.

Louisiana Highway 3163

Louisiana Highway 3164

Louisiana Highway 3165

Louisiana Highway 3166

Louisiana Highway 3166 (LA 3166) runs  in a north–south direction from a cul-de-sac alongside the Mermentau River to a junction with LA 1126 south of Jennings, Jefferson Davis Parish.

Louisiana Highway 3168

Louisiana Highway 3168 (LA 3168) runs  in a north–south direction from US 90 to a point just south of I-10 in Scott, Lafayette Parish.  The route is entirely co-signed with LA 93.

LA 3168 heads north from US 90 along Apollo Road.  Upon reaching a roundabout intersection with St. Mary Street, the town's main north–south thoroughfare, the LA 3168 designation ends.  LA 93 continues immediately through an interchange with I-10 at Exit 97.

LA 3168 was constructed around 1979 as a truck route for LA 93, which followed St. Mary Street through the center of town.  It became the actual route of LA 93 when St. Mary Street was subsequently returned to local control.  However, the LA 3168 designation remains and is entirely co-signed with the portion of LA 93 on Apollo Road.

Louisiana Highway 3169

Louisiana Highway 3169 (LA 3169) is an approximate  highway located east of Colfax, Grant Parish. It travels between LA 8 and US 71/LA 8 through a mostly wooded area. The road has been discontinuous since October 2010 as the bridge over the Bayou Rigolette is closed.

Louisiana Highway 3170

Louisiana Highway 3173

Louisiana Highway 3173 (LA 3173) runs  in a general north–south direction through Krotz Springs, St. Landry Parish.

The route begins at LA 105 (South Levee Road) and proceeds west along 2nd Street.  It then turns north onto 9th Avenue, crosses the Union Pacific Railroad (UP) tracks, and intersects LA 3174 (Main Street).  LA 3173 turns east onto Main Street for one block then north onto 8th Avenue to an intersection with LA 3178 (Florida Street).  Here, LA 3173 turns west and reaches its terminus at US 190 just west of the Krotz Springs Bridge over the Atchafalaya River.  LA 3173 is an undivided two-lane highway for its entire length.

The upper section of LA 3173 was formerly part of LA 105 before the construction of the current westbound bridge span caused a slight realignment of that route.  LA 3173 was added to the state highway system around 1973, and its route has remained the same to the present day.

Louisiana Highway 3174

Louisiana Highway 3174 (LA 3174) runs  in an east–west direction along Main Street in Krotz Springs, St. Landry Parish.

The route begins at US 190 and heads south briefly before curving to the east.  It enters the town of Krotz Springs and proceeds to a terminus at LA 3173 (9th Avenue).  LA 3174 is an undivided two-lane highway for its entire length.  Truck traffic from the industrial area south of town is directed onto LA 3174 to reach westbound US 190.

In the pre-1955 state highway system, LA 3174 was part of State Route 7.  After the 1955 Louisiana Highway renumbering, it became part of the original route of LA 105.  LA 3174 was created when construction of the current westbound span of the Krotz Springs Bridge caused a slight realignment of LA 105 in the early 1970s.

Louisiana Highway 3177

Louisiana Highway 3178

Louisiana Highway 3178 (LA 3178) runs  in an east–west direction along Florida Street in Krotz Springs, St. Landry Parish.

The route begins at the intersection of Florida Street and 8th Avenue, a junction with LA 3173, and proceeds east to LA 105 (North Levee Road).  It provides a more direct connection between US 190 and LA 105 at the west end of the Krotz Springs Bridge over the Atchafalaya River.  It is an undivided two-lane highway for its entire length.

LA 3178 connects the original and current alignments of LA 105, which was slightly realigned in the early 1970s when the current westbound span of the Krotz Springs Bridge was constructed.

Louisiana Highway 3179

Louisiana Highway 3179 (LA 3179) runs  in a north–south direction from LA 44 to US 61 in Reserve, St. John the Baptist Parish.

Louisiana Highway 3180

Louisiana Highway 3181

Louisiana Highway 3182

Louisiana Highway 3182 (LA 3182) runs  in an east–west direction from LA 182 to LA 87 in Jeanerette, Iberia Parish.  It connects the two routes by way of a swing bridge across Bayou Teche constructed in 1980.

Louisiana Highway 3184

Louisiana Highway 3184 (LA 3184) runs  in a north–south direction from LA 3025 to I-10 in Lafayette, Lafayette Parish.  It is a largely commercial corridor that connects I-10 with Cajun Field, the Cajundome Convention Center, and Lafayette's southwest suburbs.

The route heads northwest on Bertrand Drive from LA 3025 then curves due north onto Ambassador Caffery Parkway.  Shortly afterward, LA 3184 intersects US 90 (Cameron Street).  The highway then crosses the BNSF/Union Pacific Railroad (UP) tracks by way of an overpass and proceeds to an interchange with I-10 at Exit 100.  LA 3184 is a divided four-lane highway for its entire length.

Louisiana Highway 3185

Louisiana Highway 3185 (LA 3185) runs  in a northwest to southeast direction from LA 308 west of Thibodaux, Lafourche Parish to LA 20 in Schriever, Terrebonne Parish.  The route is generally known as West Thibodaux Bypass Road.

LA 3185 initially heads southwest from LA 308 (Bayou Road), immediately crossing Bayou Lafourche and intersecting LA 1.  After curving to the southeast, LA 3185 crosses from Lafourche Parish into Terrebonne Parish.  The highway terminates soon afterward at LA 20 in Schriever.  It is an undivided two-lane highway for its entire length.

Louisiana Highway 3186

Louisiana Highway 3187

Louisiana Highway 3188

Louisiana Highway 3188 (LA 3188) runs  in a north–south direction from US 61 to I-10 in LaPlace, St. John the Baptist Parish.  It is one of two highways that connect LaPlace to the interstate.

LA 3188 heads north from US 61 (West Airline Highway) on Belle Terre Boulevard, a divided four-lane commercial thoroughfare.  There are four signalized intersections along the route: US 61, a shopping strip entrance, Fairway Drive, and St. Andrews Boulevard.  Just north of the latter, LA 3188 enters an undeveloped area at the north end of LaPlace.  The highway curves to the northeast, engaging in a trumpet interchange with I-10 at Exit 206, connecting to New Orleans and Baton Rouge.

The highway was constructed in the early 1980s and involved re-routing and extending the existing Belle Terre Boulevard to I-10.  The original alignment curved northeast onto what is now Lakewood Drive, ending at the Belle Terre Country Club.

Louisiana Highway 3190

Louisiana Highway 3191

Louisiana Highway 3193

Louisiana Highway 3193 (LA 3193) runs  in a north–south direction from LA 44 to LA 3125 in Lutcher, St. James Parish.

From the south, LA 3193 begins at LA 44, which follows the east bank levee of the Mississippi River.  It proceeds northwest on Lutcher Avenue, an undivided two-lane residential thoroughfare.  Just after crossing the Canadian National Railway (CN) tracks at grade, the highway intersects LA 641 (West Main Street).  LA 3193 continues past St. James Parish Hospital and widens to a divided four-lane highway shortly before reaching its terminus at LA 3125.

Louisiana Highway 3194

Louisiana Highway 3194 (LA 3194) runs  in an east–west direction from LA 173 to the concurrent US 71/LA 1 in Shreveport.

Louisiana Highway 3195

Louisiana Highway 3195 (LA 3195) runs  in a north–south direction from LA 182 to the junction of LA 86 and LA 344 east of New Iberia, Iberia Parish.

Louisiana Highway 3196
This is an unpaved route with no major junctions apart from its endpoints at US 425/84 and LA 569.

Louisiana Highway 3197

Louisiana Highway 3197 (LA 3197) runs  in a southwest to northeast direction along Bayou Black Drive between two points on LA 182 in Houma, Terrebonne Parish.  It is a discontinuous remnant of the original alignment of US 90 through the area.

From the southwest, LA 3197 begins at a junction with LA 182 and LA 315 at the intersection of Bayou Black Drive and Barrow Street.  It proceeds northeast on Bayou Black Drive alongside the Houma Golf Course.  At the intersection of Bayou Black Drive with Country Club Drive and Mulberry Road, LA 3197 turns northwest and shortly reaches a dead end at the former location of the Houma Canal bridge.  The route resumes on the north side of the canal and proceeds northwest a short distance to its terminus at LA 182 (Barrow Street) opposite the concurrent LA 311 and LA 312.

LA 3197 is an undivided two-lane highway for its entire length.

Louisiana Highway 3198

Louisiana Highway 3198 (LA 3198) ran  in a southwest to northeast direction along what is now LA 182 connecting Raceland with US 90 in Lafourche Parish.  LA 3198 was part of the original alignment of US 90 before the Raceland bypass was opened in the late 1970s.

From the southwest, LA 3198 began at an interchange with US 90 (Exit 210) and LA 3052 (now also part of US 90).  It proceeded northeast along the present LA 182, intersecting LA 653 and LA 652 on the way to Raceland.  LA 3198 reached its terminus at LA 1 in Raceland opposite Bayou Lafourche.

Louisiana Highway 3199

Louisiana Highway 3199 (LA 3199) ran  in a southwest to northeast direction along what is now LA 182 connecting Raceland with US 90 in Lafourche Parish.  LA 3198 was part of the original alignment of US 90 before the Raceland bypass was opened in the late 1970s.

From the southwest, LA 3199 began at an intersection with LA 1 on the south side (west bank) of Bayou Lafourche.  It proceeded northeast along the present LA 182, intersecting LA 307 along the northeastern tip of Raceland.  LA 3199 reached its terminus shortly thereafter at US 90 alongside the BNSF/Union Pacific Railroad (UP) tracks.

References

External links
La DOTD State, District, and Parish Maps